The Canadian Institute of Public Health Inspectors (CIPHI) is the national professional association that represents environmental public health professionals (EPHPs) in Canada.  CIPHI has a national executive council and eight regional branches.  The organization is managed and operated entirely by volunteer members.

References

External links
 http://www.ciphi.ca/

Medical and health organizations based in British Columbia
Environmental health organizations
Professional associations based in Canada